Pierre Peyrusson (27 April 1881 – 16 September 1914) was a French backstroke and freestyle swimmer. He competed in three events at the 1900 Summer Olympics. He was killed in action during World War I.

References

External links
 

1881 births
1914 deaths
French male backstroke swimmers
French male freestyle swimmers
Olympic swimmers of France
Swimmers at the 1900 Summer Olympics
Sportspeople from Limoges
French military personnel killed in World War I